George Radcliffe Colton (April 10, 1865 – April 6, 1916) was the governor of Puerto Rico from November 6, 1909 to November 5, 1913, a position to which he was appointed by President William Howard Taft.

Born in Galesburg, Illinois, he went to Knox College. In the 1880s he was a rancher in New Territory. He served in the Nebraska House of Representatives 1889-1890 and was a bank examiner in Nebraska. He served in the United States Army in the 1st Nebraska Volunteer Infantry Regiment and was commissioned a lieutenant colonel. He was stationed in the Philippines, Dominican Republic, and Puerto Rico.

In the 1910 U.S. Census of Puerto Rico, in April, George Colton lived in barrio Catedral on Allen Street (Calle de Allen). He lived there with his sister Margarite Colton and three servants. He gave his birthplace as Illinois and that of his parents as Maine. His neighbor on one side was Mannie H. Smith, a teacher, and on the other side, George R. Shanton, who was the chief of police.

Notes

References
 LAST MOST BRILLIANT; Army and Navy Reception at the White House. THREE THOUSAND INVITATIONS Larger Number of Guests Than Were Present on Previous Occasions This Season—President and Mrs. Roosevelt Assisted by Members of the Cabinet and Ladies of Their Households. The Washington Post. Washington, D.C.: Feb 17, 1905. pg. 9, 1 pgs
 

1865 births
1916 deaths
People from Galesburg, Illinois
Knox College (Illinois) alumni
Members of the Nebraska House of Representatives
Governors of Puerto Rico